Chodzko or Chodźko is a surname. Notable people with the surname include:

 Adam Chodzko (born 1965), British multimedia artist
 Aleksander Chodźko (1804–1891), Polish poet, Slavist, and Iranologist
 Leonard Chodźko (1800–1871), Polish historian, geographer, cartographer, and publisher
 Lysette Anne Chodzko (born 26 September 1963), known professionally as Lysette Anthony, English actress and model
 Witold Chodźko (1875–1954), Polish social activist, public health pioneer, neurologist and psychiatrist